Extremity of femur may refer to:

 Lower extremity of femur
 Upper extremity of femur